It's About Time is the debut album by Danny Boy, released on April 20, 2010. The album features pre-recorded songs with production from DJ Quik and DeVante Swing and has guest appearances from Roger Troutman and JoJo from Jodeci.

Track listing

Personnel
 Paul Schultz - artwork 
 John Hyland - album sequencing, track selection
 Sonya Pead - production coordinator
 Kasey Burdick - digital engineer
 WIDEawake/Deathrow Entertainment - executive producer
 DJ Quik - producer
 DeVante Swing - producer 
 Stacey Smallie - background vocals 
 Mastered at: Penguin Studios

References

2010 debut albums
Albums produced by DJ Quik
Albums produced by G-One
Death Row Records albums